Kendriya Vidyalaya, Khanapara (informally K.V. Khanapara or K.V.K) is a co-educational school in Guwahati, Assam, India. It is part of the Kendriya Vidyalaya Sangathan (KVS) and affiliated to the Central Board of Secondary Education (CBSE). It is the oldest Kendriya Vidyalaya in the North-Eastern region of India.

The institute began in 1966.

Academics 
Kendriya Vidyalaya, Khanapara offers a wide range of subjects for the initial years of study and Higher education. For the Senior Secondary Education, the school offers three Science, Commerce and Humanities with a number of optional subjects as per KVS guidelines.

There was a pass percentage of 99.52% and 99.42% in 2020 AISSE and AISSCE respectively.

Notable alumni 
The alumni of Kendriya Vidyalaya Khanapara are called KVians. Notable alumni include:

 Manash Ranjan Pathak, Judge, Gauhati High Court
 Achintya Malla Bujor Barua, Judge, Gauhati High Court
 Mayukh Hazarika, musician
 Angaraag Mahanta, musician

References 

Government schools in India
Co-educational schools in India
Schools in Guwahati
Kendriya Vidyalayas
Educational institutions established in 1966
1966 establishments in Assam